Michael Lang (November 3, 1875 – March 2, 1962) was an American gymnast. He competed in four events at the 1904 Summer Olympics.

References

External links
 

1875 births
1962 deaths
American male artistic gymnasts
Olympic gymnasts of the United States
Gymnasts at the 1904 Summer Olympics
Place of birth missing